Source Lake is a lake in the Nelson River drainage basin in the Unorganized part of Kenora District in Northwestern  Ontario, Canada.

The primary outflow is an unnamed creek at the west, which flows to the Little Black Sturgeon River, then via the Black Sturgeon River and the Winnipeg River to the Nelson River.

See also
List of lakes in Ontario

References

Lakes of Kenora District